The governor of Laguna is the highest political office in the province of Laguna, Philippines.

List of governors of Laguna
The following is the list of governors of Laguna.

Spanish colonial government

Revolutionary government (First Philippine Republic)

Civil government under American colonial rule

Philippine Commonwealth

Japanese occupation

Second Philippine Republic

Elections
 1980 Laguna local elections
 1988 Laguna local elections
 1992 Laguna local elections
 1995 Laguna local elections
 1998 Laguna local elections
 2001 Laguna local elections
 2004 Laguna local elections
 2007 Laguna local elections
 2010 Laguna local elections
 2013 Laguna local elections
 2016 Laguna local elections
 2019 Laguna local elections
 2022 Laguna local elections

Election results

1992

1995

1998

2001

2004

2007

2010

2013

2016

2019

2022

See also
 Laguna
 Laguna Provincial Board
 Legislative districts of Laguna

External links
Official Website of the Province of Laguna

Governors of provinces of the Philippines
Government of Laguna (province)